Kitai may refer to:

 Kitai, Tanzania
 Kitay-gorod, a part of central Moscow formerly within the city walls
 Kitai Raige, a character in the movie After Earth
 Kitai, a Russian name for China, a cognate of the English word Cathay
 Kitai, another name for Qitai, a city in Xinjiang Province, China
 Kitai, a Japanese term for airframe used before 1945 by the Japanese army; see

People
 Davidi Kitai, Belgian professional poker player
 Kazuo Kitai, Japanese photographer
 Yuki Kitai, Japanese footballer
 Yuko Kitai, Japanese dressage rider

See also
 Kitay (disambiguation)

Japanese-language surnames